George Townsend Andrews (19 December 1804 – 29 December 1855) was an English architect  born in Exeter.  He is noted for his buildings designed for George Hudson's railways, especially the York and North Midland Railway.  Andrews' architect's practice in York did not confine itself to railway work, its other buildings including headquarters for two York-based banks and a number of churches.

Life
Andrews' roots lay in Jamaica and in London, but from the 1820s he was mainly in York. He was assistant to Peter Frederick Robinson.

He won a Society of Arts premium in 1824. He was a council member of the Yorkshire Architectural Society, and Sheriff of York in 1846-47, during George Hudson's third term as mayor.

In 1836 he was appointed a Fellow of the Institute of British Architects in London.

He died in York on 29 December 1855.

Railway work
Andrews designed all the buildings, not only the stations, for the York and North Midland Railway (Y&NMR) from the middle of 1839 until the work dried up in 1849 following the downfall of George Hudson.  Having designed the new York station jointly for the Y&NMR and the Great North of England Railway (GNER), he went on to design buildings for the GNER as far north as Northallerton.  He designed all the buildings for the Newcastle and Darlington Junction Railway and the Yorkshire buildings of the York, Newcastle and Berwick Railway.

The Y&NMR opened its first section from a temporary station outside the walls of York in May 1839 but Hudson wanted to bring the railway into the heart of York, which meant  breaching the city walls.  Andrews provided the favoured design for the requisite entry in the form of a Tudor arch.  The new station was laid out to a plan by Robert Stephenson, which was a development of his plan for Euston station making allowances for York's status as a junction.  Andrews designed the station buildings.  They comprised two separate trainsheds, joined at each end, producing a hipped appearance, which became one of Andrew's trademarks.  Each shed was (like Euston) of 40 ft span and the roof was supported by wrought iron "Euston trusses", giving a more slender airy construction than contemporary wooden station roofs.  The train sheds were clad with slate on wooden planking, with the portion nearest the apex being glazed.  The main station facilities were ranged along the departure platform with a central booking office flanked by the waiting rooms for each class (and a separate waiting room for ladies); provision was also made for parcels traffic, left luggage, the station master and the maintenance of lamps.  On the first floor was the Y&NMR boardroom and offices.  Adjacent to the arrivals platform were 1st and 2nd class refreshment rooms and a bar with bedrooms above.

Due to delays in agreeing the building design with the GNER the station was incomplete when services started running to London. It finally opened on 4 January 1841.

The station at York embodied many of the features Andrews was to use in his other medium and large stations for the Y&NMR, in particular the hipped roof supported by "Euston trusses" but in later examples, the glazed portion of the roof was raised and given louvered sides to let smoke and steam out. Locomotives were  not originally expected to enter York station but later that roof too was modified.  Other features characteristic of Andrew's buildings include marked overhanging eaves and chimney stacks with an arch over the apex of the roof.

Stations

Stations with an overall roof are denoted thus: Station Name

Y&NMR Main Line 1839
York - opened 1841, Y&NMR station closed 1877, roof removed 1967
Ulleskelf
Bolton Percy, closed
Castleford
Sherburn-in-Elmet
Normanton opened 1840, G.T. Andrews "Italian Villa" style station opened September 1841

GNER Main Line 1839
York - opened 1841, Y&NMR station closed 1877, roof removed 1967
Alne, closed
Raskelf, closed
Shipton, closed
Sessay, closed

York to Scarborough, Y&NMR 1845
Haxby, closed 1930
Strensall, closed 1930
Flaxton, closed 1930
Barton renamed Barton Hill (1853), closed 1930
Howsham, closed 1849
Kirkham Abbey, closed 1930
Castle Howard, closed 1930

Huttons renamed Huttons Ambo (1885), closed 1930
Malton, roof removed 1989
Rillington, closed 1930, roof removed 1955
Knapton, closed 1930
Heslerton, closed 1930
Sherburn renamed Wykeham (1874), renamed Weaverthorpe (1882), closed 1930
Ganton, closed 1930
Seamer
Scarborough Central - opened 1845

Rillington Junction to Whitby, Y&NMR 1845-7
Marishes Road, closed 1965
Kirby, closed 1858
Pickering, roof removed 1952, closed 1965, re-opened (NYMR) 1973, replica GT Andrews design roof now in place..
Levisham, closed 1965, re-opened (NYMR) 1973
Goathland (Incline Top), closed 1865
Grosmont
Sleights
Ruswarp
Whitby, roof removed 1953

Seamer to Hull, Y&NMR, 1846-7
Cayton, closed 1952
Gristhorpe, closed 1959
Filey
Hunmanby
Speeton, closed 1970
Bempton
Marton renamed Flamborough (1884), closed 1970
Bridlington, roof removed 1961
Carnaby, closed 1970
Burton Agnes, closed 1970
Lowthorpe, closed 1970
Nafferton
Driffield, roof removed 1949
Hutton Cranswick
Lockington, closed 1960
Arram
Beverley
Cottingham
Hull Paragon - opened 1848, roof replaced 1904

York to Market Weighton, Y&NMR 1847
Earswick, closed 1965
Warthill, closed 1959
Holtby, closed 1939
Stamford Bridge, closed 1965
Fangfoss, closed 1959
Pocklington, closed 1965
Nunburnholme, closed 1951
Londesborough, closed 1965
Market Weighton, roof removed 1947, closed 1965

Non-railway work
 the original buildings of York St John University
 the de Grey Rooms
 head offices for two banks and the Yorkshire Insurance Company (now Harkers pub on St Helen's Square)
 the Halifax Infirmary
 the Montpelier Baths in Harrogate
 the White Hart Hotel, Harrogate 1846
 renovations to some 18 churches, including that at Newton on Ouse
 Dewsbury Terrace, York - a terrace of 15 two-storey houses in Bishophill
 Priory Street, York - two pairs of townhouses (no.s 8 & 10, 31 & 33) in Bishophill
 The Newton on Ouse Primary School and School House

References

External links

19th-century English architects
1804 births
1855 deaths
York and North Midland Railway
British railway architects
North Eastern Railway (UK) people
Architects from Exeter
Architects from Yorkshire
People from York